Frank Farrar (29 March 1893 – 30 May 1973) was an Australian cricketer. He played two first-class matches for New South Wales in 1914/15.

See also
 List of New South Wales representative cricketers

References

External links
 

1893 births
1973 deaths
Australian cricketers
New South Wales cricketers